Elisson Aparecido Rosa (born 26 March 1987 in Belo Horizonte), simply known as Elisson, is a Brazilian footballer who plays as a goalkeeper.

Honours
Cruzeiro
Campeonato Brasileiro Série A: 2013, 2014
Campeonato Mineiro: 2014

External links
Elisson at playmakerstats.com (English version of ogol.com.br and zerozero.pt)

Elisson at ZeroZero

1987 births
Living people
Brazilian footballers
Brazilian expatriate footballers
Association football goalkeepers
Footballers from Belo Horizonte
Campeonato Brasileiro Série A players
Campeonato Brasileiro Série B players
Primeira Liga players
Cruzeiro Esporte Clube players
Esporte Clube Itaúna players
Villa Nova Atlético Clube players
C.D. Nacional players
Esporte Clube Rio Verde players
Coritiba Foot Ball Club players
Nacional Atlético Clube (SP) players
Ipatinga Futebol Clube players
Figueirense FC players
Brasiliense Futebol Clube players
Grêmio Esportivo Juventus players
Associação Atlética Caldense players
Brazilian expatriate sportspeople in Portugal
Expatriate footballers in Portugal